The 1971 Western Michigan Broncos football team represented Western Michigan University in the Mid-American Conference (MAC) during the 1971 NCAA University Division football season.  In their eighth season under head coach Bill Doolittle, the Broncos compiled a 7–3 record (2–3 against MAC opponents), finished in fourth place in the MAC, and outscored their opponents, 228 to 124.  The team played its home games at Waldo Stadium in Kalamazoo, Michigan.

The team's statistical leaders included Ted Grignon with 912 passing yards, Larry Cates with 819 rushing yards, and Keith Pretty with 352 receiving yards. Quarterback Ted Grignon and linebacker Tom Elias were the team captains. Elias also received the team's most outstanding player award.

Schedule

References

Western Michigan
Western Michigan Broncos football seasons
Western Michigan Broncos football